The House of Windsor, the royal house of the United Kingdom and 14 other Commonwealth realms, includes the male-line descendants of Queen Victoria who are subjects of the Crown (1917 Order-in-Council) and the male-line descendants of Queen Elizabeth II (1952 Order-in-Council). According to these two Orders-in-Council, male-line female descendants lose the name Windsor upon marriage.

The line of Prince Arthur, Duke of Connaught and Strathearn, the third son of Victoria, died out in 1974, with the death of Princess Patricia of Connaught, later Lady Patricia Ramsay.

The line of Prince Leopold, Duke of Albany, the youngest son of Victoria, were not considered members of the House of Windsor, as they had fought on the German side during World War I as Dukes of Saxe-Coburg and Gotha (except for the Duke's daughter, Princess Alice, Countess of Athlone, who was considered a member of the House of Windsor as she remained in the United Kingdom).

Three of the current members of the House of Windsor are Roman Catholic (labelled "CA" in the table) and are thus excluded from the line of succession to the British throne. The remaining 49 are in the line of succession, though not consecutively. Two of those 49 were previously excluded from the line of succession due to having married Catholics, but they were restored in 2015 when the Succession to the Crown Act 2013 came into effect.

House of Windsor: Table of male line descendants of George V
Members
 Descendants of George V in male line
 Descendants of Elizabeth II in male line

See also
British royal family
British prince
British princess
Mountbatten-Windsor
Descendants of George V
Windsor, Berkshire
Windsor Castle

Notes

References

Further reading
Longford, Elizabeth Harman (Countess of Longford). The Royal House of Windsor. Revised ed. Crown, 1984.
Roberts, Andrew. The House of Windsor. University of California Press, 2000.

External links
 Official website of the Royal Family